"1000 Miles" is the fourth single by Australian rock band Grinspoon from their third studio album New Detention (June 2002). It was released on 18 August 2003 by Universal Music Australia, which reached the ARIA Singles Chart top 100.

The three other tracks on the single were recorded in early 2003 at the band's live performance at the Enmore Theatre in Sydney, on their Panic Attack Tour. This release also includes a music video for the song, which is animated and was not broadcast on television, it features rednecks and has band member, Phil Jamieson, as a preacher endorsing alcohol.

The song was played on Triple J radio as an album track during the latter half of 2002 and reached No. 47 on the station's Hottest 100 for that year.

Track listing

Charts

Release history

References

2003 singles
Grinspoon songs
2002 songs
Universal Records singles
Song recordings produced by Phil McKellar
Songs written by Phil Jamieson